Hugh Anderson FRSE (1920–2003) was a theologian who served as Professor of the New Testament at Edinburgh University for over 20 years.

Life

He was born in Galston in Ayrshire on 18 May 1920 the son of Hugh Anderson and his wife Jeannie Muir. He was educated at Galston Primaty School then Kilmarnock Academy. He then studied Classics and Semitic Languages at Glasgow University.

In the post-war period 1945/6 he was part of the Huts and Canteens Scheme in Egypt and Palestine before returning to Glasgow University to start lecturing on the Old Testament. In this period he gained his first doctorate (PhD) on the New Testament. In this same period he was also minister of Trinity Church in Pollockshields in Glasgow (destroyed by fire in 1988).

In 1957 he left Scotland to become Professor of Biblical Criticism at Duke University in North Carolina, USA. Much in demand, he preached at the Riverside Church in New York and at the Washington National Cathedral.

In 1966 he returned to Scotland as Professor of New Testament replacing Prof J S Stewart.

In 1987 he was elected a Fellow of the Royal Society of Edinburgh.

He died on 14 January 2003.

Publications

Jesus and Christian Origins (1964)
Jesus (1968)
The Gospel of Mark (1976)

Family

In 1945 he was married to Jean Goldie Torbit and they had three children.

References

1920 births
2003 deaths
People from East Ayrshire
Alumni of the University of Glasgow
Academics of the University of Edinburgh
Scottish theologians
Fellows of the Royal Society of Edinburgh
People educated at Kilmarnock Academy